Superstarved (stylized as superstarved★ or superstarved*) is the third studio album by Gravity Kills, released March 19, 2002. The album is described as "more riff-oriented" and "grindier" and shares similarities to nu metal music.

Production 
The band signed with major record label Sanctuary Records in New York in March 2000 before the release. According to guitarist Matt Dudenhoeffer, approximately 30 songs were written for the album, of which about 12 were likely make it to the finished album. "Eclipse", "Shake", "Photograph", "Monsters & Astronauts", "Naked", and "Hollow" were going to be on the album, but ended up not being included. Jason Slater was going to be producing the album, but did not. The band originally recorded the cover version of Depeche Mode's "Personal Jesus" in 1999, then released it in 2002.

Songs 

"Love, Sex, and Money" was the last song written for the album. The video for the song was in shot in Seattle, San Francisco and Chicago with live footage of the band performing on the Superstarved Tour.

Jeff Scheel says that "Forget Your Name" was his first experiment from switching from Digital Performer to Logic Audio. It was described by a reviewer as an "angst ridden 'love song' in the loosest sense."

"Beg and Borrow" is the most emotional song on the album. Scheel describes it as lonely, emotional and desperate. On August 18, 2011, Scheel uploaded his piano cover of "Beg and Borrow" on SoundCloud as a free download. This was the first time in nine years that he had created a studio song and a studio cover.

Track listing

Album's cover art and name
The star on the album's cover is in connection with the album's name, "superstarved", which designer Craig Wagner created for Gravity Kills's album. The word refers to the condition of extreme malnutrition. The name came from a comment on what the band went through changing record labels between their second and third albums.

Personnel
Gravity Kills
 Jeff Scheel - lead vocals
 Matt Dudenhoeffer - guitar
 Doug Firley - keyboard
 Brad Booker - drums

Additional musicians
 Julian Beeston - programming
 Matt Dudenhoeffer - backing vocals on "Fifteen Minutes"
 Richard Fortus - guitars on "Wide Awake" and "One Thing"
 Charles Levi - bass on "Superstarved"
 Derek Geisser - guitar on "Enemy"
 Bob Dog Caitlin - sitar on "Take It All Away"

Production
 Produced by Martin Atkins and Gravity Kills
 Engineered by Julian Beeston
 Mixed by Julian Beeston and Martin Atkins, except "One Thing" (Chris Greene and Martin Atkins) at ASI Chicago
 Written by Gravity Kills, except "Personal Jesus" (Martin L. Gore) and "Wide Awake" (Gravity Kills and Richard Fortus)
 Photos by Steve Truesdell
 Gravity Kills logo and star designed by Craig Wagner
 Artwork and design by John Bergin

References 

Gravity Kills albums
2002 albums
Sanctuary Records albums